View of the World from 9th Avenue (sometimes A Parochial New Yorker's View of the World, A New Yorker's View of the World or simply View of the World) is a 1976 illustration by Saul Steinberg that served as the cover of the March 29, 1976, edition of The New Yorker. The work presents the view from Manhattan of the rest of the world showing Manhattan as the center of the world.

View of the World has been parodied by Columbia Pictures, The Economist, Mad, and The New Yorker itself, among others. The work has been imitated and printed without authorization in a variety of ways. The film poster for Moscow on the Hudson, led to a ruling by the United States District Court for the Southern District of New York in Steinberg v. Columbia Pictures Industries, Inc. in favor of Steinberg because of copyright violations by Columbia Pictures.

The illustration was regarded in 2005 as one of the greatest magazine covers of the prior 40 years.

Background
Saul Steinberg created 85 covers and 642 internal drawings and illustrations for The New Yorker, including its March 29, 1976, cover, titled "View of the World from 9th Avenue". This is regarded as his most famous work. It is considered an example of unintentional fame: Steinberg has noted that the type of fame that resulted from the work has diminished his significance to "the man who did that poster". The work is sometimes referred to as A Parochial New Yorker's View of the World or A New Yorker's View of the World because it depicts a map of the world as seen by self-absorbed New Yorkers. At one point The New Yorker applied for a copyright from the United States Copyright Office for the work. It assigned the copyright to Steinberg and subsequently reproduced posters of the painting.

Detail
The illustration is split in two parts, with the bottom half of the image showing Manhattan's Ninth Avenue, Tenth Avenue, and the Hudson River (appropriately labeled), and the top half depicting the rest of the world. It is a westward view from Ninth Avenue. Buildings along Ninth Avenue are shown in detail, with those between Ninth Avenue and the river also shown but in less detail; individual cars and trucks are drawn along the streets, and pedestrians are drawn along the sidewalks. The rest of the United States is the size of the three New York City blocks and is drawn as a rectangle bounded by North American neighbors Canada and Mexico, with a thin brown strip along the Hudson representing "Jersey", the names of five cities (Los Angeles; Washington, D.C.; Las Vegas; Kansas City; and Chicago) and three states (Texas, Utah, and Nebraska) scattered among a few rocks for the United States beyond New Jersey, which is in bolder font than the rest of the country beyond the Hudson. Washington, D.C. is depicted as a remote location near Mexico. The Pacific Ocean, slightly wider than the Hudson, separates the United States from three flattened land masses labeled China, Japan and Russia. The image depicts the world with a back turned to Europe, which is absent from the painting.

The work is composed in ink, pencil, colored pencil, and watercolor on paper and measures . When exhibiting this work along with alternate versions and sketches, the University of Pennsylvania summarized the work as a "bird's-eye view of the city from Ninth Avenue in a straight line westward, with space becoming ever more condensed..." They also described the work as a tongue-in-cheek view of the world. New York  interpreted the New York-centric mind's view of the rest of the world as a set of outer boroughs as iconic. National Post journalist Robert Fulford described the perspective as one in which the entire world is a suburb of Manhattan.

Parodies
View of the World has been imitated without authorization in a variety of ways. The work has been imitated in postcard format by numerous municipalities, states and nations. Steinberg had stated that he could have retired on royalties from the many parodies made of the painting, had they been paid, a motivation for his eventual copyright lawsuit for the Moscow on the Hudson use. Fulford, writing in The National Post, noted that the metaphor of the world as a suburb of Manhattan was "understood and borrowed" by the whole world. Local artists, especially poster artists, presented similarly compelling depictions of their own provincial perceptions. Fulford demonstrated the prominence of this work by mentioning that a high school in suburban Ottawa made imitating View of the World an assignment in its graphic arts class. He also noted that the result of this assignment was a worldwide variety of global foci from which the students viewed the world.

The illustration—humorously depicting New Yorkers' self-image of their place in the world, or perhaps outsiders' view of New Yorkers' self-image—inspired many similar works, including the poster for the 1984 film Moscow on the Hudson; that movie poster led to a lawsuit, Steinberg v. Columbia Pictures Industries, Inc., 663 F. Supp. 706 (S.D.N.Y. 1987), which held that Columbia Pictures violated the copyright Steinberg held on his work.

The cover was later satirized by Barry Blitt for the cover of The New Yorker on October 6, 2008. The cover featured Sarah Palin looking out of her window seeing only Alaska, with Russia in the far background.

The March 21, 2009 The Economist included a story entitled "How China sees the World" that presents a parody that is also an homage to the original image, but depicting the viewpoint from Beijing's Chang'an Avenue instead of Manhattan. A caption above the illustration reads "Illustration by Jon Berkeley (with apologies to Steinberg and The New Yorker)". It accompanied an article that discussed the burgeoning Chinese economy at the time of the contemporary financial crisis.

The October 1, 2012 cover of Mad Magazine satirized the problems with the September release of Apple Inc.'s iOS 6 mobile operating system which included Apple Maps, a replacement for Google Maps. The work presents what View of the World might look like if one had relied upon the September 2012 version of Apple Maps to locate various landmarks.

Other parodies have depicted the view from Massachusetts Route 128 technological corridor, Jerusalem, various European cities, and various other locations worldwide.

Critical review
On October 17, 2005, American Society of Magazine Editors unveiled its list of the greatest 40 magazine covers of the prior 40 years and ranked View of the World from 9th Avenue in fourth place. The listing stated that the work "...has come to represent Manhattan's telescoped perception of the country beyond the Hudson River. The cartoon showed the supposed limited mental geography of Manhattanites."

References

External links
View of the World from 9th Avenue at the Saul Steinberg Foundation

1976 works
American art
Individual printed cartoons
Works originally published in The New Yorker
American satire
Maps of New York City